All Saints' Church, Elston is a Grade II* listed parish church in the Church of England in Elston, Nottinghamshire, England.

History
The church dates from the 13th century. It was restored in 1837. The chancel was restored and the vestry rebuilt in 1856.

Memorials
Memorials include:
Rev. John Darwin, 1805, by Wallis, Newark. North chancel 
Will Darwin, 1760. South chancel
George Chapell, 1766. South nave
George Lascelles, 1616, Tower arch
William Alvey Darwin, 1783 by Wallis, Newark. South aisle, west wall
Jane Darwin, 1835
Robert Darwin, 1754. North wall
Robert Waring Darwin, 1816, by Wallis, Newark. North aisle wall
Elizabeth Hill Darwin, 1804, by Taylor of York
William Waring, 1835. West wall
Elizabeth Darwin, 1835, by Tyley, Bristol
Jane Eleanor Darwin, 1838. South wall
Ann Darwin, 1813, by Wallis of Newark.  Tower, south wall
Susanna Darwin, 1789 by Wallis of Newark. West wall
William Darwin 1682 
Rev. John Darwin, 1818, by Wallis and Marshall. North wall
Bust of Erasmus Darwin on marble support, left of altar.

Organ
The organ is by Bishop and Starr dating from 1872. A specification of the organ can be found on the National Pipe Organ Register.

References

Church of England church buildings in Nottinghamshire
Grade II* listed churches in Nottinghamshire